This is a list of hospitals in Turkey.

Adana
 Özel Avicenna Ataşehir Hastanesi
 Özel Acıbadem Adana Hastanesi
 Özel Adana Hastanesi
 Özel Adana Metro Hastanesi
 Özel Algomed Hastanesi
 Özel Avrupa Hospital Hastanesi
 Özel Çukurova Göz Hastanesi
 Özel Epc Hastanesi
 Özel Güney Adana Hastanesi
 Özel Medline Adana Hastanesi
 Özel Ortadoğu Hastanesi
 Özel Ortopedia Hastanesi
 Özel Ceyhan Çınar Hastanesi
 Özel Kozan Sevgi Can Hastanesi
 Özel Kozan Kalepark Hastanesi
 Çukurova Üniversitesi Tıp Fakültesi Balcalı Hastanesi
 Başkent Üniversitesi Adana Uygulama ve Araştırma Merkezi
 Avicenna International Hospital
 Adana Devlet Hastanesi
 Adana Numune Eğitim ve Araştırma Hastanesi
 Adana Kadın Doğum ve Çocuk Hastalıkları Hastanesi
 Adana Dr. Ekrem Tok Ruh Sağlığı ve Hastalıkları Hastanesi
 Ceyhan Devlet Hastanesi
 Karaisalı Devlet Hastanesi
 Kozan Devlet Hastanesi
 İmamoğlu Devlet Hastanesi
 Pozantı Devlet Hastanesi
 Tufanbeyli Devlet Hastanesi

Ankara
See List of hospitals in Ankara.

Antalya
Başkent Üniversitesi Alanya Uygulama ve Araştırma Merkezi

Balıkesir
See List of hospitals in Balıkesir.

Bursa
See List of hospitals in Bursa.

Çanakkale
Çanakkale Devlet Hastanesi

Denizli
Denizli Devlet Hastanesi

Diyarbakır
Diyarbakır Devlet Hastanesi
Diyarbakır Asker Hastanesi

Erzurum
Erzurum Mareşal Fevzi Çakmak Asker Hastanesi
Erzurum Bölge Eğitim Araştırma Hastanesi

Erzincan
 Erzincan Devlet Hastanesi
 13 Şubat Devlet (SSK) Hastanesi

Eskişehir
 Eskisehir Yunusemre Devlet Hastanesi
 Eskişehir Hava Hastanesi
 Osmangazi Universitesi Arastirma Hastanesi
 Anadolu Universitesi Mavi Hastanesi
 Acıbadem Hastanesi
 Ozel Umit Hastanesi

Istanbul
 Emsey Hospital, Pendik
 Avicenna Hospital, Ataşehir
 Acıbadem Hospitals Group
 Bakırköy Psychiatric Hospital
 Balıklı Greek Hospital
 Başakşehir Çam and Sakura City Hospital
 Marmara University Prof. Dr. Asaf Ataseven Hospital
 Sancaktepe Prof. Dr. Feriha Öz Emergency Hospital
 Surp Agop Hospital
 Taksim German Hospital
 Yeşilköy Prof. Dr. Murat Dilmener Emergency Hospital
 Avicenna International Hospital
 Arnavutköy Government Hospital, Arnavutköy
 Batı Bahat Hastanesi, İkitelli
 Düzey Göz Merkezi Istanbul / Avcilar
 Estethica Plastic Surgery Hospitals
 Estetik International Istanbul
 Ethica Hospital
 Gayrettepe Florence Nightingale Hastanesi, Gayrettepe
 Göktürk Florence Nightingale Tıp Merkezi, Göktürk
 Göz Sağlığı Merkezi
 Ivf center in Turkey
 Kadıköy Florence Nightingale Hastanesi, Kadıköy
 Medicana tüp bebek merkezi istanbul
 Memorial Hastanesi, Şişli, Etiler, Ataşehir, Suadiye
 Memorial HIZMET Hospital, Istanbul
 MetropolDoctors, Levent İstanbul
 St Peters Hospital Bakırköy, Istanbul
 Superplast Estetik Cerrahi Merkezi, Nişantaşı İstanbul
 Yaşar Hospital, Bakırköy

İzmir
See List of hospitals in İzmir.

Kocaeli
Gölcük Deniz Hastanesi
Gebze Fatih Devlet Hastanesi
Gebze Devlet Hastanesi
Özel Gebze Merkez Hastanesi
Kocaeli Devlet Hastanesi
Kocaeli Üniversitesi Tıp fakültesi
özel Yeni yüzyıl hastanesi
Gebze Tıp merkezi
Yeşim Tıp Merkezi
Özel Akademi hastanesi
Gebze Şifa tıp merkezi

Konya
SSK Konya Doğumevi ve Çocuk Hastalıkları Hastanesi
Konya Başkent Hastanesi
Konya Numune Hastanesi
Konya Meram Tıp Fakültesi Hastanesi

Mersin
 Mersin University Hospital
 Mersin state Hospital
 Private IMC Hospital
 Private Sistem Tıp Hospital
 Private Doğuş Tanrıöver Hospital
 Private  Toros Hospital
 Private Yenişehir Hospital

Muğla

 Muğla Kamu Hastaneleri Birliği
 Muğla Eğitim Araştırma Hastanesi
 Fethiye Devlet Hastanesi
 Milas Devlet Hastanesi
 Bodrum Devlet Hastanesi
 Marmaris Devlet Hastanesi
 Yatağan Devlet Hastanesi
 Köyceğiz Devlet Hastanesi
 Dalaman Devlet Hastanesi
 Ortaca Devlet Hastanesi
 Datça Devlet Hastanesi
 Muğla Ağız ve Diş Sağlığı Merkezi
 Fethiye Ağız ve Diş Sağlığı Merkezi

Şırnak Province
 Şırnak State Hospital

Nazilli
SSK Nazilli Hastanesi

Tekirdağ
Çorlu Asker Hastanesi

Zonguldak
SSK Karadeniz-Ereğli Hastanesi, Karadeniz-Ereğli, Özel Anadolu Hastanesi, Karadeniz-Ereğli

Others
City Hospital
Çağıner Hastanesi
Diomed Hastanesi
Dr. Zekai Tahir Burak Kadın Hastanesi
 Florence Nightingale Avrupa Hospital, Şişli
 Florence Nightingale Hospital, Çağlayan
 Florence Nightingale Metropolitan Hospital, Gayrettepe
 Florence Nightingale Hospital, Göktürk
 Göz Sağlığı Merkezi
KBB Tıp Merkezi
Medline Sağlık Hizmetleri
Oltu Devlet Hastanesi
Özel Derman Polikliniği
Özel Güneş Hastanesi
Yenikent State Hospital
T.C. Ziraat Bankası Hastanesi
Turgut Özal Tıp Merkezi KBB Anabilim Dalı
Universal Hospital

References